Aquamarine is a 2006 American teen fantasy romantic comedy film directed by Elizabeth Allen, loosely based on the 2001 young adult novel of the same name by Alice Hoffman. It stars Emma Roberts, Joanna "JoJo" Levesque, and Sara Paxton. The film was released in the United States on March 3, 2006, by 20th Century Fox.

Plot 
Best friends Claire and Hailey are enjoying their last few days of summer vacation in their small beach town of Baybridge, near Tampa, before Hailey moves to Australia due to her mother's job as a marine biologist. Hailey prays to the ocean god for a miracle to make her mother change her mind about moving; minutes later, a violent storm occurs.

The next night, the girls sneak into the local pool, where they discover a mermaid named Aquamarine, who was washed in by the storm. Aquamarine befriends the girls and explains that she ran away from home because she had been forced into an arranged marriage. To end the engagement, Aquamarine must to prove to her father that true love exists.

Aquamarine reveals her ability to change her tail into legs during the day, but explains she will revert back into her true mermaid form if she touches water, as well when the sun sets. She also confesses that she has her eyes set on Raymond, a lifeguard Hailey and Claire have had a crush on for years. They are reluctant to help her woo Raymond, but agree Aquamarine explains that anyone who helps a mermaid is granted a wish, hoping they can use the wish to prevent Hailey from moving.

Not understanding human social cues, Aquamarine is rejected by Raymond when they first meet. The girls promise to make Raymond fall in love with her in the next three days using strategies found in teen magazines. A group of popular girls headed by Cecilia, the local meteorologist's spoiled daughter who is also interested in Raymond, attempt to sabotage Aquamarine.

Aquamarine and Raymond bond at a local dance but she is forced to leave since her legs turn into a tail at sunset. Before departing, she kisses him and asks him to meet her on the pier in the morning. Cecilia follows the girls to the water tower where Aquamarine is staying, and discovers her secret. She unhooks the ladder to prevent Aquamarine from leaving, and calls the news so she can expose her on national television. The town's mysterious handyman helps Aquamarine escape, and she grants him a wish. Cecilia's father furiously confiscates her car as punishment for embarrassing the family on national television.

The next morning, Aquamarine asks Raymond if he loves her. Raymond says he likes her but has not fallen in love with her yet, since they have only been on one date, and that he wants to take his time in getting to know her. Aquamarine is heartbroken. Cecilia interrupts and pushes her into the ocean, where Aquamarine turns back into a mermaid. Raymond is shocked but rushes to get his rescue board to save her, much to Cecilia's dismay.

Aquamarine's father summons a giant storm, dragging Aquamarine back homeward, but Hailey and Claire jump into the ocean to her aid. When Aquamarine asks why they risked their own lives to save her, they respond that they love her. The power of the girls' friendship finally convinces Aquamarine's father of true love's existence and the storm abates. The girls receive their wish, but decide to not use it to keep Hailey from moving away, because her mother worked hard for the job in Australia. Instead, they save the wish and say goodbye to Aquamarine, who promises to visit. Raymond also asks her to visit him and they kiss. Back on shore, Raymond thanks the girls for their bravery and for introducing him to Aquamarine. Hailey and Claire tell each other they will miss each other and part ways.

In the stage booklet during the end credits, it is revealed that Claire, Raymond, and Aquamarine meet up with Hailey in Australia a year later and explore the Great Barrier Reef together.

Cast
 Sara Paxton as Aquamarine
 Emma Roberts as Claire Brown
 JoJo as Hailey Rogers
 Jake McDorman as Raymond
 Arielle Kebbel as Cecilia Banks
 Claudia Karvan as Ginny Rogers
 Bruce Spence as Leonard
 Tammin Sursok as Marjorie
 Roy Billing as Bob Brown
 Julia Blake as Maggie Brown
 Shaun Micallef as Storm Banks
 Lulu McClatchy as Bonnie
 Natasha Cunningham as Patty
 Dichen Lachman as Beth
 Lincoln Lewis as Theo
 Alice Hunter as Beach Girl
 Benjamin Shields as Beach Boy

Voices
 Sara Paxton as Aquamarine's starfish earrings
 Emma Roberts as Claire's starfish earrings
 JoJo as Hailey's starfish earrings

Production
Principal photography for the movie began in Australia in February 2005, and wrapped up the following April.

Home media
The film was released on DVD on June 13, 2006, and on Blu-ray on March 6, 2012.

Reception

Box office
In its opening weekend, Aquamarine grossed $7.5 million in 2,512 theaters, ranking #5 at the box office. By the end of its run, the film grossed $18.6 million domestically, and $4.4 million internationally, for a worldwide total of $23 million.

Critical response
On review aggregator Rotten Tomatoes, the film has an approval rating of 51% based on reviews from 88 critics, with an average rating of 5.44/10. The site's consensus states: "A lighthearted, gum-smacking, boy-crazy film with a hopeful message for young girls." On Metacritic, Aquamarine has a weighted average score of 51 out of 100, based on 27 reviews, indicating "mixed or average reviews". Audiences surveyed by CinemaScore gave the film a grade of "A−" on scale of A to F.

Michael Rechtshaffen of The Hollywood Reporter called Aquamarine a "bright and breezy tween fantasy romantic comedy that coasts along on its charming performances and the light comedic touch of first-time feature director Elizabeth Allen." Variety's Joe Leydon praised the film, writing, "The high-concept premise ... has been fleshed out with inventive wit, unsticky warmth and more than a little wackiness. Result is an unusually likeable family-friendly comedy that could appeal far beyond its target [audience]".

Numerous critics praised the film's themes and message. Grading the film a "B−", Chris Kaltenbach of The Baltimore Sun liked how "Aquamarine exhibits a welcome empathy for adolescent girls and an understanding of how they interact" while teaching the difference between "what is important (friendship, self-confidence, altruism) and what seems important (puppy love, trendiness, running with the pack)." Describing Aquamarine as engendering a "vision of cherished sisterhood", Callie Ahlgrim of Insider wrote that the film "is a rom-com insofar as it tells a boy-meets-girl story—but the deeper, more honest love between its young female leads is the film's true emotional core." Wesley Morris of The Boston Globe wrote that Aquamarine "is unique because it's the rare movie that fiercely respects the altruistic loyalty that bonds girls to one another." Ruthe Stein of the San Francisco Chronicle found that while the film "has a sweetness and innocence that makes it near perfect entertainment for its target audience", Aquamarine "avoids seeming coy and doesn't flinch from taking on serious issues that illustrate that life isn't all fluff even for the young." Rating the film 3 out of 5 stars, Roger Moore of the Orlando Sentinel wrote, "Aquamarine really is just an adorable movie. And along the way, life lessons about love, friendship, adjusting to bad news and overcoming grief are passed along in a not-that-obvious fashion." Rating it 3 out of 4 stars, Todd Hertz of Christianity Today wrote, "The movie scores a major victory in reaching its audience with the all-too-important message that they are fine just the way they are."

Other critics were less positive. Carrie Rickey of The Philadelphia Inquirer wrote, "Like its title character, Allen's choppy and inconsistent film has two speeds, ditsy or sentimental, and never gathers momentum." Reviewing Aquamarine for the BBC, Stella Papamichael rated the film 2 out of 5 stars, writing, "the worthy message about the value of friendship, central to Alice Hoffman’s novel, is drowned out by a sappy, magazine-style portrait of girlhood that’s all lip-gloss and giggles." Marrit Ingman of The Austin Chronicle also rated the film 2 out of 5 stars but enjoyed some aspects, like its making fun of the dating advice in teen magazines such as CosmoGirl.

Critics praised the cast's performances. Calling Paxton's portrayal of Aquamarine "impish, anxious and ebullient", Leydon hailed her "impressive talent for physical comedy", while Rechtshaffen wrote that Paxton "has an infectious, nutty energy". Roger Ebert praised Roberts and Levesque for their "unstudied charm", while Leydon lauded their "credible and compelling relationship with each other" as well as their "pitch-perfect reactions as straight women" to Paxton. Stein highlighted Roberts's performance, particularly her portrayal of Claire's vulnerability.

Accolades

Legacy
Since its release, Aquamarine has become a cult film and is especially popular among Generation Z. It has been ranked as one of the best "mermaid movies" by USA Today and Teen Vogue.

Soundtrack

 "One Original Thing"Cheyenne Kimball
 "Strike"Nikki Flores
 "Connected"Sara Paxton
 "Gentlemen"Teddy Geiger
 "One and Only"Teitur
 "Island in the Sun"Emma Roberts
 "Time for Me to Fly"Jonas Brothers
 "Can't Behave"Courtney Jaye
 "Summertime Guys"Nikki Cleary
 "One Way or Another"Mandy Moore
 "Sweet Troubled Soul"Stellastarr
 "I Like the Way"Bodyrockers
Two of the film's stars, Roberts and Paxton, were featured on the soundtrack. In 2008, La La Land Records and Fox Music released a limited edition CD (1000 pressings) of David Hirschfelder's score (incorporating Paxton's voice) for the film.
 "Main Titles"
 "The Storm"
 "Washed Ashore"
 "Claire Falls In"
 "Meeting Aqua"
 "The Next Morning/Shell Phone Call"
 "Making the Deal"
 "Ray & Aqua/Magazines"
 "Paddleboat Date"
 "The Water Tower"
 "Hailey Rides the Dolphins"
 "Aqua's Decision"
 "First Kiss"
 "Cecilia Climbs the Tower"
 "Hailey and Claire Argue"
 "The Pier/Storm/The Buoy"
 "The Tear/Goodbyes"
 "Finale"
Other songs featured in the film
 "A Comer Chicharron (Guaracha)"Charanga Cubana
 "City Girls Jr."Simon Leadley
 "Control Me"The A Team
 "Dejenme Vivir"Charanga Cubana
 "Don't Cry Baby"Alana Dafonseca
 "Drive Me Crazy"Miss Eighty 6
 "I Rock Hard"Miss Eighty 6
 "Island in the Sun"Halfday
 "Big WavePearl Jam
 "Underground"Puretone
 "Smile"Vitamin C
 "Right Now 2004" - Atomic Kitten

See also
 Mermaids in popular culture

References

External links
 
 
 

2006 films
2006 directorial debut films
2006 fantasy films
2006 romantic comedy films
2000s English-language films
2000s buddy comedy films
2000s coming-of-age comedy films
2000s fantasy comedy films
2000s female buddy films
2000s romantic fantasy films
2000s teen comedy films
2000s teen fantasy films
2000s teen romance films
20th Century Fox films
American buddy comedy films
American coming-of-age comedy films
American fantasy comedy films
American female buddy films
American romantic comedy films
American romantic fantasy films
American teen comedy films
American teen romance films
Coming-of-age romance films
Films about mermaids
Films about shapeshifting
Films about vacationing
Films based on American novels
Films based on children's books
Films based on fantasy novels
Films based on young adult literature
Films directed by Elizabeth Allen Rosenbaum
Films scored by David Hirschfelder
Films set in Florida
Films shot at Village Roadshow Studios
Films shot in Louisiana
Films shot in New South Wales
Films shot in Queensland
2000s American films